Mount Field may refer to:

 Mount Field (Antarctica)
 Mount Field (Tasmania), in Australia
 Mount Field National Park, in Australia
 Mount Field (British Columbia), in Canada
 Mount Field (cricket ground), in Faversham, England
 Mount Field (New Hampshire), in the United States

See also
 Mountfield (disambiguation)
 Field Hill, British Columbia, Canada
 Field (disambiguation)